Gonolobus arizonicus, common name  Arizona milkvine, is a species of plant in the family Apocynaceae. It is endemic to Arizona, found in Pima, Santa Cruz, Pinal, and Graham Counties.

References

External links
photo of herbarium specimen at Missouri Botanical Garden, isolectotype of Lachnostoma arizonicum, collected in Santa Catalina Mountains of Pima County, Arizona

arizonicus
Flora of Arizona
Plants described in 1885